John Fox (born 16 February 1963) is an Australian water polo player who competed in the 1988 Summer Olympics and in the 1992 Summer Olympics.

References

External links
 

1963 births
Living people
Australian male water polo players
Olympic water polo players of Australia
Water polo players at the 1988 Summer Olympics
Water polo players at the 1992 Summer Olympics
Australian water polo coaches
Australia men's national water polo team coaches
Water polo coaches at the 2008 Summer Olympics
Water polo coaches at the 2012 Summer Olympics